Ammothamnus is a genus of flowering plants in the family Fabaceae. It belongs to the subfamily Faboideae. It is sometimes included in the genus Sophora.

Species
Ammothamnus comprises the following species:
 Ammothamnus gibbosus (DC.) Boiss.

 Ammothamnus lehmannii Bunge
 Ammothamnus songoricus (Schrenk) Lipsky ex Pavlov

References

External links

Sophoreae
Fabaceae genera